Yang Lin (born March 14, 1981, in Dalian) is a retired Chinese football player. He is the manager of China League Two club Guangxi Pingguo Haliao currently.

Club career

Shanghai United
Yang Lin started his professional football career in 2002 with second tier football club Dalian Sidelong and would go on to established himself as a regular as the club moved from Dalian to Zhuhai then to Shanghai while changing their name multiple times, eventually to Shanghai United. He played a significant role in the promotion of Zhuhai Zobon into the China Super League in the 2004 league season.

Henan Construction
At the beginning of 2007 he joined the newly promoted Henan Construction in the China Super League where he had a very productive season where he played in 14 league games and scored one goal. After seeing Henan establish themselves as mid-table team the following season was to prove less successful for Yang Lin as he was only able to make seven appearances for Henan.

Return to Dalian
After a personally disappointing season for Yang Lin which saw him lose his place at Henan he transferred to Dalian Shide. At Dalian, Yang Lin would be utilized as a centre back due to his height for several games. He would return to his position as a striker against Shenzhen F.C. in a league game which saw him score his first goal for Dalian. When his season long loan period ended he decided to stay in Dalian with the newly formed Dalian Aerbin F.C. and play within the third tier during the beginning of the 2010 league season.

International career
He made his debut for the senior national team on December 17, 2002, in a friendly against Syria in a 3–1 victory. In 2007, he played in the early stages of the 2010 FIFA World Cup qualification where he scored his first goal against Myanmar national football team, however since then he only made several further friendly appearances before being dropped from the team.

Career statistics

Club statistics
Statistics accurate as of match played 4 November 2017.

International statistics 
Last updated:23 April 2008

Honors
Dalian Aerbin
 China League Two: 2010
 China League One: 2011

References

External links
 Yang Lin at Football-Lineups.com
 
 

1981 births
Living people
Association football forwards
Chinese footballers
Footballers from Dalian
China international footballers
Henan Songshan Longmen F.C. players
Dalian Shide F.C. players
Dalian Professional F.C. players
Cangzhou Mighty Lions F.C. players
Chinese Super League players
China League One players
Guangxi Pingguo Haliao F.C. managers